The Willmore, formerly known as The Stillwell, is a historic apartment building in downtown Long Beach, California. It has been listed on the National Register of Historic Places since May 20, 1999.

Design
The Willmore was designed in the Renaissance Revival style by Fisher, Lake and Traver, the architects of The Hollywood Roosevelt Hotel. It was originally designed as a U-shaped structure. However, only one wing was completed. The building is designed in the Renaissance Revival and Beaux-Arts styles. It has an underground parking garage.

History
Built in 1925 by the Trewitt-Shields Company, the structure has an L shape with a ten-story wing and an eleven-story wing. 

The building's current name honors William E. Willmore, developer of a forerunner to Long Beach, Willmore City, and namesake of the Willmore neighborhood.

See also
 List of City of Long Beach Historic Landmarks

References

	
Downtown Long Beach
National Register of Historic Places in Los Angeles County, California
Renaissance Revival architecture in California
Apartment buildings in California
Residential buildings completed in 1927
1927 establishments in California